Rotafolia is a genus of the extinct Sphenophyllales horsetails.

References

Horsetails
Devonian plants
Carboniferous plants
Prehistoric plant genera
Late Devonian first appearances
Mississippian extinctions